Juan Pujol may refer to:

 Juan Pujol, Argentina, a town in Argentina
 Juan Pujol García (1912–1988), Spanish spy and double agent
 Juan Pujol (cyclist) (born 1952), Spanish racing cyclist

Pujol, Juan